The Francis P. Whitehair Bridge, also known as the Crows Bluff Bridge, is a double leaf bascule bridge located in Crows Bluff, Florida that carries State Road 44 over the St. Johns River. The original bridge on the site was constructed in 1917; replaced in 1955, and though it was previously expected to remain in service until the 2050s, a new version of the bridge is under construction.

History
The original Crows Bluff Bridge was a swing span bridge; constructed in 1917, in 1926 it became a free crossing. In 1954, a plan for construction of a replacement bridge was established; the new bridge, dedicated to DeLand resident Francis P. Whitehair, opened on September 22, 1955.

In the late 1980s and early 1990s the bridge was closed several times for repairs.

A 1993 truck accident damaged the bridge, requiring repairs to its guardrails. In 2006 a truck caused damage to the bridge's support beams in another accident; the damage was repaired within a week.

References

External links

 Crossing the bridge
 Technical paper on the bridge's mechanism.

Bridges over the St. Johns River
Bridges completed in 1955
Road bridges in Florida
Bridges in Volusia County, Florida
1955 establishments in Florida
Bascule bridges in the United States